The Sanremo Music Festival 2006 was the 56th annual Sanremo Music Festival, held at the Teatro Ariston in Sanremo, province of Imperia, between late February and early March 2006 and broadcast by Rai 1.

The show was presented by Italian comedian Giorgio Panariello, who also served as the artistic co-director, with showgirls Ilary Blasi and Victoria Cabello. It consisted of a competition between 30 songs, divided into four different categories—Men, Women, Groups and Newcomers. As in the previous year, a winner for each category was announced, and the final winner of the competition was selected among the artist which took first place in one of the five sections.

On 4 March 2006, Povia with his entry "Vorrei avere il becco", after placing first in the Men section, was announced the winner of the competition, beating I Nomadi's "Dove si va", Anna Tatangelo's "Essere una donna" and Riccardo Maffoni's "Sole negli occhi", winners of the sections Groups, Women and Newcomers, respectively.

Presenters and personnel

In June 2005, Rai 1 director Fabrizio Del Noce announced that he was planning to choose Italian comedian Giorgio Panariello and actress Sabrina Ferilli as the presenters of the Sanremo Music Festival 2006. In October of the same year, Panariello was officially confirmed as the presenter of the event. Panariello also served as the artistic director of the show, together with Gianmarco Mazzi, who was confirmed for the third time in this role. Victoria Cabello and Ilary Blasi were later announced as the co-presenters of the 56th Sanremo Music Festival, while Sabrina Ferilli did not take part in the show. Models Marta Cecchetto, Claudia Cedro, Vanessa Hessler and Francesca Lancini also took part in the show, introducing the competing artists during the 5 nights of the music contest.

The Sanremo Festival Orchestra was directed by Renato Serio, while the scenography was created by the Academy Award-winning production designer Dante Ferretti. The authors of the show, directed by Paolo Beldì, were Eddi Berni, Riccardo Cassini, Claudio Fasulo, Pietro Galeotti, Giorgio Panariello, Carlo Pistarino and Claudio Sabelli Fioretti.

Nights

First night

Men, Women and Groups sections
Key:
 – Contestant competing in the "Men" section.
 – Contestant competing in the "Women" section.
 – Contestant competing in the "Groups" section.

Guests and other performances
 American actor John Travolta was the first international guest of the show. He was interviewed by Victoria Cabello, and he performed a fragment of Domenico Modugno's 1958 hit "Nel blu dipinto di blu", as a duet with Giorgio Panariello.
 The Italian curling team, which competed in the 2006 Winter Olympics, also appeared during the night, explaining the rules of curling and showing how to play it, during a sketch with Giorgio Panariello.

Second night

Men, Women and Groups sections
Key:
 – Contestant competing in the "Men" section.
 – Contestant competing in the "Women" section.
 – Contestant competing in the "Groups" section.

Newcomers section

Guests and other performances
 Italian soccer player Francesco Totti, who was in the audience to support his wife and presenter Ilary Blasi, was interviewed by Giorgio Panariello. After the interview, the chorus performed a fragment of Claudio Baglioni's "Questo piccolo grande amore", regarded by Totti and Blasi as the symbol of their love story. 
 After Nicky Nicolai's performance, American singer and actor Jesse McCartney was introduced as the first international guest of the night. He sang his single "Because You Live".
 Riccardo Cocciante also appeared on stage to receive the City of Sanremo Award. He also performed the songs "Bella senz'anima" and "Margherita".
 At the end of the night, American singer Hilary Duff performed her song "Wake Up".

Third night

Men, Women and Groups sections
Key:
 – Contestant competing in the "Men" section.
 – Contestant competing in the "Women" section.
 – Contestant competing in the "Groups" section.

Newcomers section

Guests and other performances
 Italian actor Leonardo Pieraccioni opened the night with a sketch, in which he announced for joke that presenter Panariello had refused to appear on stage during the third night as a result of criticisms and poor ratings received during the previous episodes of the show.
 During the night, after Britti's performance of his entry "...solo con te", Panariello interviewed American wrestler John Cena.
 Actor Carlo Verdone performed Assunta De Senis, a fictional old woman from the past editions of the Sanremo Music Festival. During his performance, he was joined on stage by Silvio Muccino to promote the film Il mio miglior nemico, in which they both starred.
 Maria Grazia Cucinotta presented the film All the Invisible Children, produced by Cucinotta herself.
 The Italian gold medalists at the 2006 Winter Olympics, including Enrico Fabris, Giorgio Di Centa, Cristian Zorzi, Fulvio Valbusa and Stefano Donagrandi, were interviewed by Panariello during the night.
 Colombian Latin pop singer Shakira was the last guest of the third episode of the Sanremo Music Festival 2006, performing her single "Don't Bother".

Fourth night

Men section

Groups section

Women section

Newcomers section

Guests and other performances
 American actor Orlando Bloom was interviewed by Victoria Cabello during the show.
 At the end of the show, American singer-songwriter Gavin DeGraw performed his hit "Chariot".
 Italian actor Arnoldo Foà also appeared for an interview. He also performed an original song.
 Domenico Dolce and Stefano Gabbana appeared on stage with models Marta Cecchetto, Claudia Cedro, Vanessa Hessler and Francesca Lancini. The models wore clothes designed for them by the founders of the fashion house Dolce & Gabbana.

Fifth night

First round
Key:
 – Contestant competing in the "Men" section.
 – Contestant competing in the "Women" section.
 – Contestant competing in the "Groups" section.
 – Contestant competing in the "Newcomer Artists" section.

Second round

Guests and other performances
 Italian actor Giancarlo Giannini opened the final of the Sanremo Music Festival 2006, performing Domenico Modugno's "Vecchio frak".
 Italian singer Andrea Bocelli performed the song "Il mare calmo della sera", which launched his career and placed first in the Newcomers section of the Sanremo Music Festival in 1994. He also dueted with American singer Christina Aguilera, performing their single "Somos Novios (It's Impossible)".
 Virna Lisi appeared on stage during the first night. She also crowned the winner of the competition.
 Eros Ramazzotti was the second guest, after Bocelli, chosen to represent the most known Italian artists which started their career at the Sanremo Music Festival. He performed a medley of "Terra promessa", "Una storia importante" and "Adesso tu", and he performed the song "I Belong to You (Il ritmo della passione)" as a duet with Anastacia.
 Laura Pausini was the last guest of the night. She performed a medley which included her previous Sanremo Music Festival entries, "La solitudine" (1993) and "Strani amori" (1994), as well as her 2005 single "Come se non fosse stato mai amore". She later performed an Italian-language cover of Charles Aznavour's "She", title "Uguale a lei".
 At the end of the performances of the competing artists, Ramazzotti and Pausini came back on stage to perform "Nel blu dipinto di blu". The song, which won the contest in 1958, was performed with its original arrangements.

Other awards

Critics Award "Mia Martini"

Press, Radio & TV Award

Ratings

References

External links
 Official Website of the Sanremo Music Festival

Sanremo Music Festival by year
2006 in Italian music
2006 song contests
2006 in Italian television